The Financial Services Volunteer Corps ("FSVC") was established in 1990 by John C. Whitehead and the late Cyrus R. Vance at the behest of U.S. President George H. W. Bush.  It is a not-for-profit organization, headquartered in New York City, whose purported mission is to build sound banking and financial systems in developing and transition countries seeking to develop market-oriented economies.

Its business model is based on a private-public partnership, in which it receives grants from the U.S. State Department (primarily through the U.S. Agency for International Development and the Middle East Partnership Initiative) in order to provide "technical assistance" and "training" in countries transitioning towards a market economy. It engages "financial experts" from the United States and other developed countries to serve as short-term, volunteer consultants in transition countries that are trying to reform their financial systems. They typically provide advice to financial regulators such as central banks, finance ministries, securities commissions, deposit insurance agencies, pension fund supervisors, or to private institutions such as stock markets, commercial banks, brokers associations and insurance companies.

FSVC was initially established to work in Eastern Europe and the Former Soviet Union following the dissolution. The organization has since expanded to work in other developing countries in Asia, Africa and the Middle East.

FSVC is also a member of the Volunteers in Economic Growth Alliance ("VEGA"), a consortium of 15 volunteer organizations that provide assistance and training in developing countries in the field of economic growth.

FSVC seeks to transfer knowledge from more market oriented economies to countries undergoing economic reform, through the use of "experts" from the world of finance. Typically the individuals engaged to provide this knowledge transfer are given a paid leave of absence from their organization to serve on FSVC assignments.

From a critical perspective, some may argue that the FSVC's work with financial institutions and regulators in developing and transition economies perpetuates a neo-colonial approach to economic development. They may argue that  FSVC promotes a neoliberal economic agenda, which prioritizes market-based solutions and deregulation over addressing social and economic inequalities as well as promoting policies such as austerity measures, which have been criticized for disproportionately affecting vulnerable populations and undermining economic growth. 

Furthermore, financial liberalization can lead to increased financial instability, particularly for countries with weak regulatory and supervisory frameworks. It can be argued that they promote the interests of large international financial institutions and foreign investors located in the global north over the needs of local communities and small and medium-sized enterprises and privatization of public services and resources, which can lead to reduced access to essential services for marginalized communities. Critics may also argue that by primarily working with financial institutions and regulators, these types of organizations may be prioritizing the interests of foreign investors and the financial sector over the needs of the broader population.Some may argue that organizations like FSVC promote the use of conditional loans and aid, which can lead to increased debt burdens and reduced sovereignty for developing countries. Additionally, some may argue that the presence of foreign volunteer experts may undermine the development of local expertise and capacity-building.

Non-profit organizations based in New York (state)